The Prince of Wales Rangers (Peterborough Regiment) was an infantry regiment of the Non-Permanent Active Militia of the Canadian Militia (now the Canadian Army). It was formed in 1936 by the Amalgamation of The Peterborough Rangers and the 3rd Prince of Wales' Canadian Dragoons. In 1946, the regiment was converted from Infantry to Artillery and would later Redesignated as the 50th Field Artillery Regiment (The Prince of Wales Rangers), RCA (now currently on the Supplementary Order of Battle).



Lineage

The Prince of Wales Rangers (Peterborough Regiment) 

 Originated on 3 May 1867, in Peterborough, Ontario, as the 57th Peterborough Battalion of Infantry.
 Redesignated on 16 January 1880, as the 57th Battalion of Infantry Peterborough Rangers.
 Redesignated on 8 May 1900, as the 57th Regiment Peterborough Rangers.
 Redesignated on 12 March 1920, as The Peterborough Rangers.
 Amalgamated on 15 December 1936, with the 3rd The Prince of Wales' Canadian Dragoons and the Headquarters and C Company of the 4th Machine Gun Battalion, CMGC, and Redesignated as The Prince of Wales Rangers (Peterborough Regiment) (MG).
 Redesignated on 5 March 1942, as the 2nd (Reserve) Battalion, The Prince of Wales Rangers (Peterborough Regiment).
 Redesignated on 1 June 1945, as The Prince of Wales Rangers (Peterborough Regiment).
 Converted on 1 April 1946, from Infantry to Artillery, and Redesignated as the 50th Heavy Anti-Aircraft Regiment (The Prince of Wales Rangers), RCA.

3rd Prince of Wales' Canadian Dragoons 

 Originated on 30 April 1875, in Cobourg, Ontario, as the 3rd Provisional Regiment of Cavalry.
 Redesignated on 14 October 1881, as the 3rd Provisional Regiment of Cavalry, The Prince of Wales' Canadian Dragoons.
 Redesignated on 25 November 1892, as the 3rd Regiment of Cavalry, The Prince of Wales' Canadian Dragoons.
 Redesignated on 1 January 1893, as the 3rd The Prince of Wales' Canadian Dragoons.
 Amalgamated on 15 December 1936, with The Peterborough Rangers and the Headquarters and C Company of the 4th Machine Gun Battalion, CMGC, and Redesignated as The Prince of Wales Rangers (Peterborough Regiment) (MG).

4th Machine Gun Battalion, CMGC 

 Originated on 1 June 1919, in Kingston, Ontario, as the 4th Machine Gun Brigade, CMGC.
 Redesignated on 15 September 1924, as the 4th Machine Gun Battalion, CMGC.
 Amalgamated on 15 December 1936, with The Peterborough Rangers and the 3rd The Prince of Wales' Canadian Dragoons, and Redesignated as The Prince of Wales Rangers (Peterborough Regiment) (MG).

Perpetuations 

 2nd Battalion (Eastern Ontario Regiment), CEF
 93rd Battalion (Peterborough), CEF
 247th Battalion (Victoria & Haliburton), CEF

History

The Second World War 
On 5 March, 1942, The Prince of Wales Rangers (Peterborough Regiment) mobilized an active service unit designated as the 1st Battalion, The Prince of Wales Rangers (Peterborough Regiment), CASF. The battalion served in Canada in a home defence role as part of the 16th Canadian Infantry Brigade, 8th Canadian Infantry Division on the Pacific Coast. On 10 January, 1945, the battalion was disbanded.

Organization

The Prince of Wales Rangers (Peterborough Regiment) (M.G.) (15 December, 1936) 

 Regimental Headquarters (Peterborough, Ontario)
 A Company (Peterborough, Ontario)
 B Company (Peterborough, Ontario)
 C Company (Peterborough, Ontario)
 D Company (Peterborough, Ontario)

Battle Honours 

 Ypres, 1915, '17
 Gravenstafel Ridge
 St. Julien
 Festubert, 1915
 Mont Sorrel
 Somme, 1916
 Pozieres
 Flers-Courcelette
 Ancre Heights
 Arras, 1917, '18
 Vimy, 1917
 Arleux
 Scarpe, 1917, '18
 Hill 70
 Passchendaele
 Amiens
 Drocourt-Quéant
 Hindenburg Line
 Canal du Nord
 Pursuit to Mons
 France and Flanders, 1915–18

See Also 

 Prince of Wales's Regiment

References 

Prince of Wales Rangers (Peterborough Regiment)
Military units and formations disestablished in 1946
Military units and formations of Ontario